"Rag Mop" was a popular American song of the late 1940s–early 1950s.

The song, a 12-bar blues, was written by Tulsa Western Swing bandleader Johnnie Lee Wills and steel guitarist Deacon Anderson and published in 1949. Considered a novelty song, the lyrics consisted mostly of spelling out the title of the song; because of the spelling used in the song, it is sometimes referred to as "Ragg Mopp". The Wills-Anderson song was adapted from a 1946 release by Henry "Red" Allen, "Get the Mop."

While Johnnie Lee Wills and his band recorded it for Bullet Records in 1950, the most popular version of this song was recorded by The Ames Brothers, and released by Coral Records as catalog number 60140. The song was part of a double-sided hit; the flip side was "Sentimental Me." The record first reached the Billboard magazine charts on January 6, 1950, and lasted 14 weeks on the chart, peaking at #1. The song was re-released in 1951 by Coral as catalog No. 60397, with the flip side "Hoop-Dee-Doo". The group re-recorded the song several times. The 1950 recording is considered an example of proto-rock and roll as it contained elements that would later go into the defining of the genre.

Parodies

      Lou Monte recorded an Italian-flavored version soon after the Ames Brothers' original, and, in 1963, Allan Sherman recorded "Rat Fink".

References

1949 songs
Number-one singles in the United States
Ames Brothers songs
Johnnie Lee Wills songs